Cuando llega el amor (English title: When love arrives) is a Mexican telenovela produced by Carla Estrada for Televisa in 1989.

Lucero and Omar Fierro starred as protagonists, while Nailea Norvind starred as main antagonist.

Plot
Isabel Contreras (Lucero) is a privileged youngster. She is beautiful, wealthy, her parents love her, she is engaged to the handsome Rodrigo (Guillermo García) and they are going to marry once she finishes school. Alonso (Francisco Bernal), her horsemanship teacher, proposes her to represent the country in an international contest.

Isabel has an enemy in her own home, her cousin Alejandra (Nailea Norvind), who hates Isabel. Alejandra wants to harm Isabel, and she does, when she seduces Rodrigo and Isabel finds them. Isabel knows that her father would kill Alejandra if he realizes about this incident, so Isabel remains silent.

Isabel breaks her engagement without giving explanations and she finds comfort in the preparations of the next tournament. Before the contest starts, Alejandra cut the reins of the horse of Isabel provoking her tumble. Isabel injures her back and she must use crutches.

Lonely and depressed, Isabel entertains herself watching through the window to the opposite apartment. Luis Felipe (Omar Fierro), a photographer, who lives in that apartment falls in love with Isabel. Alejandra meddles once again and tries to separate them.

Cast

Main
 Lucero as Isabel Contreras, daughter of Rafael and Rosalía, Alejandra's cousin, biological daughter of Alonso.
 Omar Fierro as Luis Felipe Ramírez, son of Miguel and Carmen, Ángela's brother, journalist and photographer.
 Nailea Norvind as Alejandra Contreras, Rafael's orphaned niece, hates her cousin Isabel.
 Irán Eory as Rosalía de Contreras, Rafael's wife, mother of Isabel and Lalo, former love of Alonso.
 Eric del Castillo as Don Rafael Contreras, Rosalía's husband, father of Lalo and Isabel (not biologically).

Supporting
 Francisco Bernal as Alonso Valencia, Isabel's riding instructor and biological father, former love of Rosalía.
 Miguel Pizarro as Andrés Santana, Rafael's trusted employee, in love with Alejandra.
 Guillermo García Cantú as Rodrigo Fernández Pereira, son of Gerardo and María Luisa, engaged to marry Isabel.
 Amparo Arozamena as Doña Refugio Vda. de Carrillo, Beto's grandmother, in love with Isidro.
 Raúl Buenfil as Ranas, a hoodlum, turns himself in to the police.
 Carmelita González as Carmen de Ramírez, Miguel's wife, mother of Luis Felipe and Ángela.
 Lucero Lander as Ángela Ramírez, daughter of Miguel and Carmen, Luis Felipe's sister, nurse at Gerardo's clinic.
 René Muñoz as Chucho, biological son of Nina. (Dies)
 Juan Carlos Casasola as Alberto "Beto" Carrillo, Refugio's hoodlum grandson. (Killed by Ranas)
 Polo Ortin as Don Isidro Vega, Claudia's father and Margarita's grandfather, in love with Refugio.
 Alejandra Peniche as Claudia Vega, Isidro's daughter and Margarita's mother, lover of Gerardo and Rodrigo. (Killed by María Luisa)
 Juan Felipe Preciado as Miguel Ramírez, Carmen's husband, father of Luis Felipe and Ángela.
 María Rojo as Rosa, a woman from Rafael's past.
 Evangelina Sosa as Margarita Vega, Claudia's neglected daughter and Isidro's granddaughter.
 Claudio Obregón as Dr. Gerardo Fernández, María Luisa's husband and Rodrigo's father, Claudia's lover.
 Susana Alexander as María Luisa Pereira de Fernández, Gerardo's wife and Rodrigo's mother.
 Lilia Aragón as Helena Ríos/Helen Rivers, Claudia's friend.
 Silvia Caos as Amelia, housekeeper of the Contreras family.
 Arturo Lorca as Nacho
 María Fernanda García as Paulina, Alejandra's friend.
 Surya McGregor as Dolores
 Roberto Blandón as Enrique
 Ninón Sevilla as Nina, biological mother of Chucho.
 Óscar Bonfiglio as Pablo
 Francisco Xavier as Paco
 Mónica Miguel as Yulma
 Gustavo Navarro as Fito
 Elizabeth Ávila as Julia, Isabel's friend.
 Emma Laura as Verónica, Isabel's friend.
 Lorette as Lucy
 Sergio Sendel as Chicles, a hoodlum.
 Alexis Ayala as Nicolás
 Ernesto Godoy as Güero, a hoodlum.
 Ricardo de Loera as Montero, police detective.
 Charlie Massó as Rey
 Rodrigo Vidal as Eduardo "Lalo" Contreras, son of Rafael and Rosalía, Isabel's brother.

Awards

Reception 
 Lucero's performance won her a TVyNovelas Award for best young lead actress. Hers was balanced with Nailea Norvind's as the villain.

Music
 Lucero sang the main theme and it was a hit in that year. It was released as a special album.
 As incidental music, the song "Sirius" by The Alan Parsons Project is featured.

References

External links 
 

1990 telenovelas
Mexican telenovelas
1990 Mexican television series debuts
1990 Mexican television series endings
Spanish-language telenovelas
Television shows set in Mexico
Televisa telenovelas